Emil Andersson may refer to:

 Emil Andersson (sport shooter) (born 1979), Swedish running target shooter
 Emil Andersson (table tennis) (born 1993), Swedish table tennis player